Hall Memorial Library may refer to:
Hall Memorial Library (Ellington, Connecticut)
Hall Memorial Library (Northfield, New Hampshire), listed on the National Register of Historic Places